Ron White (June 9, 1953 – April 4, 2018  was a Canadian film and television actor. During his career, he was nominated for two Genie Awards and six Gemini Awards.

Career
Born in Dawson Creek, British Columbia, Canada, White had an extensive career. Some of his most notable television roles included Conrad Peters in Tom Stone and Donny Caswell in Black Harbour. He had performed in television movies such as Another Country, Trudeau and The Arrow.

Selected filmography

Film
 The Evictors (1979) as G-Man
 Tomorrow's a Killer (1987) as Rickert
 Taking Care (1987) as Mr. Jones
 Too Outrageous! (1987) as Unknown
 Cowboys Don't Cry (1988) as Josh Morgan
 Where the Spirit Lives (1989) as Taggert
 Justice Denied (1989) as Donald C. MacNeil, Q.C.
 Love & Murder (1990) as Officer Fred
 Stella (1990) as Tony De Banza
 Unforgiven (1992) as Deputy Clyde Ledbetter
 Guilty as Sin (1993) as Prosecutor DiAngelo
 Ordinary Magic (1993) as Rick
 Blood Brothers (1993) as
 Intersection (1994) as Charlie
 Strange and Rich (1994) as Dave Strange
 Soul Survivor (1995) as Officer Smythe
 Screamers (1995) as Lieutenant Commander Chuck Elbarak
 Joan of Arc (1999, TV Mini-Series) as Jean De Dunois
 Lie with Me (2005) as Ben
 Cake (2005) as Jane's Father
 Defendor (2009) as Judge Wilson
 Erased (2012) as Dick Rhodes
 Life (2015) as Uncle Marcus (final film role)

Television
 Night Heat (1985-1987) as Teddy Mujante / Teddy Madden / Larry
 9B (1986) as Don Fowler
 Street Legal (1987-1989) as Don Chapman / Artie
 Where the Spirit Lives (1989) as Taggart
E.N.G. (1989) as Patrick Norton
 Road to Avonlea (1990-1991) as Mr. Tyler
 Dog City (1992-1995) as 'Ace' Hart (voice)
 Race to Freedom: The Underground Railroad (1994) as Unknown
 Kissinger and Nixon (1995) as Chief of Staff H.R. 'Bob' Haldeman
 Lonesome Dove (1995) as Elijah Tavish
 The Arrow (1997) as RCAF Pilot Lieutenant Jack Woodman
 The Outer Limits (1998) as George Nichols
 Black Harbour (1998-1999) as Donny Caswell
 Whitewash: The Clarence Brandley Story (2002) as Jim McCloskey
 Tagged: The Jonathan Wamback Story (2002) as Joe Wamback
 Tom Stone (2002-2003) as Conrad Peters
 Jasper, Texas (2003) as Assistant District Attorney Guy James Gray
 Plague City: SARS in Toronto (2005) as Dr. Royce
 Sybil (2007) as Dr. Atcheson
 The Line (2009) as Max
 Deadliest Sea (2009) as Burns
 Heartland (2009) as Richard Chenoweth
 Nikita (2011) as Edward Adams
 Haven (2011) as Chief Merrill
 Copper (2012-2013) as Captain Ciaran Joseph Sullivan
 Republic of Doyle (2014) as Vick Saul

Videogames
 Far Cry 4 (2014) - (voice)

Awards and nominations

References

External links
 

1953 births
2018 deaths
20th-century Canadian male actors
21st-century Canadian male actors
Canadian male film actors
Canadian male television actors
Male actors from British Columbia
People from Dawson Creek